Muru may refer to:

People
Muru (surname), a list of Estonian people with the surname Muru
Rick Muru, a New Zealand rugby league footballer

Places
Muru-Astráin, a locality in the municipality of Cizur in Navarre province, Spain
Muru, Estonia, a village in Sõmeru Parish in Lääne-Viru County, Estonia
Muru, Iran, a village in Zarand County in Kerman Province, Iran
Muru (Lom), a river in Innlandet county, Norway
Muru, Nepal, a village in the Western Rukum District of Karnali Province, Nepal
Muru River, a river of Acre state in western Brazil
Mount Muru, a sandstone mountain located in Sarawak, Malaysia

Film
Muru (film), a 2022 film directed by Tearepa Kahi

Other
Muru (Māori concept), a traditional concept of compensation in Māori culture
Muru-D, an Australian startup accelerator founded in 2013
Muru language, a dialect language spoken in Chad